The Atomic Kid is a 1954 American black-and-white science fiction comedy film directed by Leslie H. Martinson and starring Mickey Rooney and Robert Strauss. It was distributed by Republic Pictures and produced by Maurice Duke and Mickey Rooney.

Plot
While uranium prospector "Blix" Waterberry is in the desert, eating a peanut butter sandwich, he wanders into an active atomic bomb test site and is accidentally exposed to radiation from a direct overhead A-bomb blast. He miraculously survives, becoming radioactive, and in the process gaining special powers. He is then recruited for his powers by the FBI to help break up a spy ring. After helping to capture the spy ring, Bix and his former nurse decide to get married. They head toward Las Vegas and get lost in the desert along the way. They stop at a lone ranch-style house they come upon to ask for directions, only to discover that the house is open and mannequins have been placed in the furnished house. Bix has somehow driven into another active atomic bomb test site! In a dead panic, he hurriedly drives himself and his fiance away from ground zero before history has a chance to repeat itself.

Cast
 Mickey Rooney as Barnaby 'Blix' Waterberry
 Robert Strauss as Stan Cooper
 Elaine Devry as Audrey Nelson 
 Bill Goodwin as Dr. Rodell
 Robert Emmett Keane as Mr. Reynolds
 Whit Bissell as Dr. Edgar Pangborn
 Joey Forman as MP in hospital
 Dan Riss as Jim, FBI Chief Agent
 Peter Leeds as FBI Agent Bill
 Hal March as FBI Agent Ray
 George E. Mather as 1st Sergeant
 Fay Roope as Gen. Lawlor
 Bill Welsh as Commentator
 Stanley Adams as Wildcat Hooper
 Robert Nichols as Bob (Technician)
 Paul Dubov as Anderson (advertising agent)
 Peter Brocco as Comrade Mosley
 Trustin Howard as Corporal
 Charles J. Conrad as Scientist
 Sig Frohlich as Photographer
 Milton Frome as Communications man

Production
The film's screenplay is based on a story by Blake Edwards.

Rooney's character "Blix" Waterberry wanders into an atomic test site, and, as one reviewer describes, "Mannequins are depicted sitting around the dinner table in front of their plastic meal, awaiting the predetermined bomb drop ... Rooney remains with the mannequin family and discovers at the last minute that an atomic bomb will be detonated over his head. In a deliberately humorous scene, Rooney frantically tries to find a place to hide from the approaching explosion, only to close his eyes and stick his fingers in his ears as the bomb goes off".

Nurse Audrey Nelson (Elaine Devry), who marries "Blix" at the end, is the only female character in the film's opening credits and promotional posters, where she is billed as "Elaine Davis". At the time The Atomic Kid was being filmed, Devry/Davis was married to Mickey Rooney in real life.

In popular culture
 This is the feature film showing in 1955 at the fictional Town Theater in the fictional Hill Valley in 1985's science fiction comedy Back to the Future.

References

Bibliography
 Ted Okuda, "The Atomic Kid: Radioactivity Finds Andy Hardy" in Science Fiction America: Essays on SF Cinema (edited by David J. Hogan; McFarland, 2006), pp. 120–129.
 Bill Warren. Keep Watching The Skies, Vol I: 1950–1957. Jefferson, North Carolina: McFarland & Company, 1982. .
 David Wingrove, Science Fiction Film Source Book (Longman Group Limited, 1985).

External links
 

1954 films
American science fiction comedy films
American black-and-white films
1950s English-language films
Films directed by Leslie H. Martinson
Films about nuclear war and weapons
Republic Pictures films
1950s science fiction comedy films
1950s American films